Valentin Halattre (6 November 1904 – 19 February 1961) was a French racing cyclist. He rode in the 1928 Tour de France.

References

1904 births
1961 deaths
French male cyclists